Baise Rajya were sovereign and intermittently allied petty kingdoms on the Indian subcontinent, ruled by Khasas from medieval Nepal, located around the Karnali-Bheri river basin of modern-day Nepal. The Baise were annexed during the unification of Nepal from 1744 to 1810. The gorkha kingdom's founder Prithvi Narayan Shah (ruled 1743–1775) did not live to see this, but his son and grandson annexed the entire collection by the end of the 18th century.

The 24 principalities were Jumla, Doti, Jajarkot, Bajura, Gajur, Malneta, Thalahara, Dailekh District, Dullu, Duryal, Dang, Sallyana, Chilli, House of Tulsipur, Darnar,  Atbis Gotam, Majal, Gurnakot, and Rukum. These Baise along with Chaubisi rajya states were ruled by Khasas and several decentralized tribal polities.

List of Rajyas (22 states)

A parallel confederation of 24 principalities Chaubisi rajya occupied most of the Gandaki basin east of the Baisi.

See also
 Dang Deukhuri District
 House of Tulsipur
 Dailekh
 Dullu
 Jumla

Notes

Citations

Sources

History of Nepal
Unification of Nepal
Kingdom of Nepal
Empires and kingdoms of Nepal